Santiago (Santiáu in Asturian language) is a parish located in Valdés, a municipality within the province and Autonomous Community of Asturias, in northern Spain.

Villages and minor entities

Parishes in Valdés